The 2019 Ohio Bobcats football team represented Ohio University in the 2019 NCAA Division I FBS football season. They were led by 15th year head coach Frank Solich and played their home games at Peden Stadium in Athens, Ohio, as members of the East Division of the Mid-American Conference.

Previous season
The Bobcats finished the 2018 season with a 9–4 record for the second straight year and finished the conference tied for second place with a 6–2 Conference Record and a invite to the Frisco Bowl where they defeated the San Diego State Aztecs.

Preseason

MAC media poll
The MAC released their preseason media poll on July 23, 2019, with the Bobcats predicted to finish in first place in the East Division. Ohio was also picked as the overall favorite to win the MAC Championship Game.

Schedule

Source:

Personnel

Coaching staff
Since December 16, 2004, the head coach of the Ohio Bobcats has been Frank Solich. He heads a staff of ten assistant coaches, four graduate assistants, a director of football operations, and a director of player personnel. Jimmy Burrow, defensive coordinator since 2005, announcement retirement on February 5, 2019.

Game summaries

Rhode Island

at Pittsburgh

at Marshall

Louisiana

at Buffalo

Northern Illinois

Kent State

at Ball State

Miami (OH)

Western Michigan

at Bowling Green

at Akron

vs. Nevada (Famous Idaho Potato Bowl)

References

Ohio
Ohio Bobcats football seasons
Famous Idaho Potato Bowl champion seasons
Ohio Bobcats football